Cerro Cinotepeque is a volcano in El Salvador. The volcano is one of a series of small volcanoes stretching to the north of Aguilares, El Salvador.

See also 
List of volcanoes in El Salvador

References 

Cinotepeque
Cinotepeque